The Governing Body of Jesus College, Oxford, (one of the constituent colleges of the University of Oxford in England) has the ability to elect "distinguished persons" to Honorary Fellowships. Under the statutes of the college, Honorary Fellows cannot vote at meetings of the Governing Body and do not receive financial reward. They can be called upon to help decide whether to dismiss or discipline members of academic staff (including the Principal).

The first three Honorary Fellows, all former students of the college, were elected in October 1877: John Rhys, the first Jesus Professor of Celtic who was later an Official Fellow (1881–95) and Principal (1895–1915); the historian John Richard Green; and the poet Lewis Morris. Three other former Principals (John Christie, Sir John Habakkuk and Sir Peter North) have been elected Honorary Fellows on retirement.  Many Honorary Fellows had previous academic connections with the college, either as Fellows or Old Members (former students), but others did not. Some of those without previous connections were distinguished Welshmen – Jesus College has had strong links with Wales since its establishment in 1571. For example, the Welsh businessman Sir Alfred Jones was elected in 1902, the Welsh judge Sir Samuel Evans was elected in 1918, and the Welsh opera singer Bryn Terfel was elected in 2008.  The Welsh politician David Lloyd George was elected to an Honorary Fellowship in 1910 when he was Chancellor of the Exchequer.  He wrote to John Rhys, the Principal at the time, to thank the college for the honour, saying:

The college noted in 1998 that the number of Honorary Fellows was markedly below the average of other Oxford colleges and it adopted a more methodical approach to increase numbers. Seven Honorary Fellows were elected that year, followed by another five in 1999. The first woman to be elected as an Honorary Fellow was the journalist and broadcaster Francine Stock, an Old Member of the college, in 2007. The Honorary Fellows have included two Old Members who later became Prime Minister of their respective countries: Norman Manley, who studied at Jesus College as a Rhodes Scholar and who was Chief Minister of Jamaica from 1955 to 1962, and Harold Wilson, who was twice British Prime Minister (1964–70 and 1974–76). As of 2015, the longest-serving Honorary Fellow is Frederick Atkinson, elected in 1979.

Honorary Fellows
The abbreviations used in the "Link" column denote the person's connection with the college before election as an Honorary Fellow:
CL – A college lecturer: Joliffe taught students at Jesus College, but he was not one of the Fellows
F – A former Fellow of the college, included on the list of Principals and Fellows
OM – Old Member of the college, included on the list of alumni
P – Principal, also included on the list of Principals and Fellows
A dash denotes that the person had no previous academic link with the college.

{|class="wikitable sortable"
|+ A list of the college's Honorary Fellows
! scope="col"| Name
! scope="col"| Year elected
! scope="col"| Link
! scope="col" class="unsortable"|Notes
! scope="col" class="unsortable"|Ref
|- valign="top"
! scope="row" |
|align="center"|1976
|align="center"|OM
|French physicist, who was also an Honorary Fellow of Merton College, Oxford
|align="center"|
|- valign="top"
! scope="row" |
|align="center"|2002
|align="center"|OM
|Master of St Catherine's College, Oxford (2002 onwards) and Professor of Engineering Science at Oxford University (1998 onwards)
|align="center"|
|- valign="top"
! scope="row" |
|align="center"|2001
|align="center"|–
|Opera singer
|align="center"|
|- valign="top"
! scope="row" |
|align="center"|1979
|align="center"|OM
|Civil servant, who served as Chief Economic Adviser to HM Treasury (1977–79)
|align="center"|
|- valign="top"
! scope="row" |
|align="center"|1971
|align="center"|OM
|American Rhodes Scholar, who became Huntington Professor of History at Boston University
|align="center"|
|- valign="top"
! scope="row" |
|align="center"|2011
|align="center"|–
|Molecular biologist who was awarded the Nobel Prize in Physiology or Medicine in 2009; awarded an honorary doctorate by the university in 2011
|align="center"|
|- valign="top"
! scope="row" |
|align="center"|1960
|align="center"|OM
|Judge in Egyptian courts
|align="center"|
|- valign="top"
! scope="row" |
|align="center"|1998
|align="center"|OM
|Member of the Australian House of Representatives (1977–94) and Minister in various Government departments (1983–94); High Commissioner to the UK (1994–98)
|align="center"|
|- valign="top"
! scope="row" |
|align="center"|2007
|align="center"|OM
|Novelist and screen
|align="center"|
|- valign="top"
! scope="row" |
|align="center"|1995
|align="center"|F
|Engineer and gounding director of the Said Business School
|align="center"|
|- valign="top"
! scope="row" |
|align="center"|2007
|align="center"|OM
|Physicist, and Vice-Chancellor of the University of Sheffield (2007 onwards)
|align="center"|
|- valign="top"
! scope="row" |
|align="center"|1947
|align="center"|OM
|Professor of Education (1924–31) then Professor of Psychology (1931–50), both at the University of London
|align="center"|
|- valign="top"
! scope="row" |
|align="center"|1998
|align="center"|OM
|Chief Executive of Commercial Union (1994–98)
|align="center"|
|- valign="top"
! scope="row" |
|align="center"|1998
|align="center"|OM
|Chairman of the Royal Shakespeare Company (1985–2000)
|align="center"|
|- valign="top"
! scope="row" |
|align="center"|1944
|align="center"|F
|Fellow in Chemistry (1907–44) and Vice-Principal (1926–44), responsible for the college laboratories (which were the last college labs in Oxford)
|align="center"|
|- valign="top"
! scope="row" |
|align="center"|1967
|align="center"|P
|Principal from 1949 to 1967
|align="center"|
|- valign="top"
! scope="row" |
|align="center"|1999
|align="center"|OM
|Former Assistant Bishop of Jerusalem, and writer on relations between Islam and Christianity
|align="center"|
|- valign="top"
! scope="row" |
|align="center"|1979
|align="center"|OM
|The first Permanent Under-Secretary at the Welsh Office (1964–69), then Principal of the University College of Wales, Aberystwyth (1969–79)
|align="center"|
|- valign="top"
! scope="row" |
|align="center"|1882
|align="center"|OM
|Professor of Geology and Paleontology at the Victoria University of Manchester (1873–1908)
|align="center"|
|- valign="top
! scope="row" |
|align="center"|1935
|align="center"|OM
|British judge, who was appointed a Lord of Appeal in Ordinary in 1946
|align="center"|
|- valign="top"
! scope="row" |
|align="center"|1920
|align="center"|OM
|Bishop of St Asaph (1889–1934) and the first Archbishop of Wales (1920–34)
|align="center"|
|- valign="top"
! scope="row" |
|align="center"|1949
|align="center"|F / OM
|Professor of History at the University of London and Director of the Institute of Historical Research (1948–60)
|align="center"|
|- valign="top"
! scope="row" |
|align="center"|1997
|align="center"|F / OM
|Jesus Professor of Celtic (1978–96)
|align="center"|
|- valign="top"
! scope="row" |
|align="center"|1979
|align="center"|–
|Welsh opera singer, given an Honorary Fellowship as a tribute to his services to Welsh music and culture
|align="center"|
|- valign="top"
! scope="row" |
|align="center"|1998
|align="center"|OM
|Historian, specialising in 20th-century German history
|align="center"|
|- valign="top"
! scope="row" |
|align="center"|1918
|align="center"|–
|President of the Probate, Divorce and Admiralty Division of the High Court (1910–18)
|align="center"|
|- valign="top"
! scope="row" |
|align="center"|1992
|align="center"|F
|Professor of Urban Studies and Economics at the London School of Economics (1976–78), Chairman of the Better Government Initiative (2006 onwards)
|align="center"|
|- valign="top"
! scope="row" |
|align="center"|1978
|align="center"|F
|Jesus Professor of Celtic (1947–78)
|align="center"|
|- valign="top"
! scope="row" |
|align="center"|1956
|align="center"|OM
|Archeologist
|align="center"|
|- valign="top"
! scope="row" |
|align="center"|1877
|align="center"|OM
|Historian, author of A History of the English People
|align="center"|
|- valign="top"
! scope="row" |
|align="center"|1992
|align="center"|OM
|Professor of Welsh at University of Wales, Aberystwyth (1970–79), Director of the Centre for Advanced Welsh and Celtic Studies (1985–93)
|align="center"|
|- valign="top"
! scope="row" |
|align="center"|1984
|align="center"|P
|Principal from 1967 to 1984, and also served as Vice Chancellor of Oxford University (1973–77)
|align="center"|
|- valign="top"
! scope="row" |
|align="center"|1986
|align="center"|F / OM
|Historian of the Renaissance
|align="center"|
|- valign="top"
! scope="row" |
|align="center"|1997
|align="center"|F
|Senior Research Fellow (1983–96); geophysicist, working in meteorology, oceanography and geomagnetism
|align="center"|
|- valign="top"
! scope="row" |
|align="center"|1998
|align="center"|OM
|Savilian Professor of Geometry (1997 onwards)
|align="center"|
|- valign="top"
! scope="row" |
|align="center"|1964
|align="center"|OM
|Biblical scholar who was Professor of Old Testament Studies at the University of London
|align="center"|
|- valign="top"
! scope="row" |
|align="center"|1983
|align="center"|F / OM
|Professor of Atmospheric Physics (1976–83)
|align="center"|
|- valign="top"
! scope="row" |
|align="center"|1972
|align="center"|OM
|Barrister (who prosecuted the Great Train Robbers) then judge of the High Court (1965–73) and Court of Appeal (1973–76)
|align="center"|
|- valign="top"
! scope="row" |
|align="center"|1934
|align="center"|CL
|Assistant tutor in mathematics at Jesus College (1903–20), then Professor of Mathematics at the University of London (1920–36)
|align="center"|
|- valign="top"
! scope="row" |
|align="center"|1902
|align="center"|–
|Welsh businessman who helped to found the School of Tropical Medicine at the University of Liverpool
|align="center"|
|- valign="top"
! scope="row" |
|align="center"|1953
|align="center"|F / OM
|Principal of St David's College, Lampeter (1923–38)
|align="center"|
|- valign="top"
! scope="row" |
|align="center"|1990
|align="center"|OM
|Civil servant, who was later chairman of Total Oil Marine (1990–98) and chairman of the Higher Education Funding Council for Wales 1996–2000
|align="center"|
|- valign="top"
! scope="row" |
|align="center"|1998
|align="center"|OM
|Former Senior Partner of Norton Rose, who served as Lord Mayor of London (2007–2008)
|align="center"|
|- valign="top"
! scope="row" |
|align="center"|1986
|align="center"|OM
|Professor of History and Philosophy of Religion, University of London (1955–77)
|align="center"|
|- valign="top"
! scope="row" |
|align="center"|1927
|align="center"|F
|Classicist who became Professor of Humanity at St Andrews University in 1899
|align="center"|
|- valign="top"
! scope="row" |
|align="center"|1910
|align="center"|–
|Welsh politician who was Chancellor of the Exchequer (1908–15) and Prime Minister (1916–22)
|align="center"|
|- valign="top"
! scope="row" |
|align="center"|1960
|align="center"|OM
|High Court judge (1960–72)
|align="center"|
|- valign="top"
! scope="row" |
|align="center"|1990
|align="center"|OM
|Television presenter (including Mastermind), journalist, translator and writer
|align="center"|
|- valign="top"
! scope="row" |
|align="center"|1958
|align="center"|OM
|Chief Minister of Jamaica (1955–62)
|align="center"|
|- valign="top"
! scope="row" |
|align="center"|1968
|align="center"|OM
|Chairman of the John Lewis Partnership (1955–72)
|align="center"|
|- valign="top"
! scope="row" |
|align="center"|1999
|align="center"|OM
|Chairman and chief executive of Gateway (1981–89), chairman of Charles Wells (1998–2003)
|align="center"|
|- valign="top"
! scope="row" |
|align="center"|1999
|align="center"|OM
|Professor of Welsh (1989–95), then Vice-Chancellor and Principal (1995–2004), at the University of Wales, Aberystwyth 
|align="center"|
|- valign="top"
! scope="row" |
|align="center"|1877
|align="center"|OM
|Anglo-Welsh poet, who was elected to an Honorary Fellowship rather than a full Fellowship because he owned too much property to qualify for a Fellowship under the terms of the college statutes then in force
|align="center"|
|- valign="top"
! scope="row" |
|align="center"|1999
|align="center"|OM
|MP for Edinburgh Leith (1970–79), Lord Advocate (1974–79), Senator of the College of Justice (1979–95)
|align="center"|
|- valign="top"
! scope="row" |
|align="center"|2005
|align="center"|P
|Principal from 1984 to 2005, and also Vice-Chancellor of Oxford University (1993–97)
|align="center"|
|- valign="top"
! scope="row" |
|align="center"|1968
|align="center"|OM
|Professor of Welsh at the University of Wales, Aberystwyth (1920–52)
|align="center"|
|- valign="top"
! scope="row" |
|align="center"|1948
|align="center"|OM
|Civil servant, who was Permanent Secretary of the Ministry of Labour (1935–44) and Chairman of the War Damage Commission (1949–59)
|align="center"|
|- valign="top"
! scope="row" |
|align="center"|1930
|align="center"|OM
|Historian, particularly of Henry VIII, and Assistant Editor of the Oxford Dictionary of National Biography
|align="center"|
|- valign="top"
! scope="row" |
|align="center"|1997
|align="center"|OM
|High Court judge
|align="center"|
|- valign="top"
! scope="row" |
|align="center"|1877
|align="center"|OM
|First Jesus Professor of Celtic (1877–1915), who was an Honorary Fellow (1877–81) before being appointed to a full Fellowship, serving as Bursar (1881–95) and as Principal (1895–1915)
|align="center"|<ref></ref>
|- valign="top"
! scope="row" |
|align="center"|1917
|align="center"|OM
|Lord Chancellor (1929–35), who was also High Steward of Oxford University
|align="center"|
|- valign="top"
! scope="row" |
|align="center"|1966
|align="center"|OM
|MP for Preston (1945–50), Deputy Speaker of the House of Lords (1973–82)
|align="center"|
|- valign="top"
! scope="row" |
|align="center"|1918
|align="center"|OM
|Physician at St Thomas's Hospital, London
|align="center"|
|- valign="top"
! scope="row" |
|align="center"|1966
|align="center"|OM
|Bishop of Llandaff (1957–71) and Archbishop of Wales (1968–71)
|align="center"|
|- valign="top"
! scope="row" |
|align="center"|1997
|align="center"|OM
|Economist and biographer of John Maynard Keynes
|align="center"|
|- valign="top"
! scope="row" |
|align="center"|1990
|align="center"|–
|Conductor of the Chicago Symphony Orchestra (1969–91) and the London Philharmonic Orchestra (1979–83); his association with Jesus College began in 1988 when his daughter, Gabrielle, became a student
|align="center"|
|- valign="top"
! scope="row" |
|align="center"|2011
|align="center"|OM
|Chief Executive of the Heritage Lottery Fund since 2003
|align="center"|
|- valign="top"
! scope="row" |
|align="center"|1982
|align="center"|F / OM
|Geographer, who was a Fellow from 1954 to 1957 before becoming Professor of Geography at Liverpool University (1957–74) and Principal of the University College of Swansea (1974–82)
|align="center"|
|- valign="top"
! scope="row" |
|align="center"|1973
|align="center"|OM
|Inventor of the world's first wearable hearing aid and a major benefactor to the college; the college flats in North Oxford were named "Stevens Close" to mark his donations
|align="center"|
|- valign="top"
! scope="row" |
|align="center"|2007
|align="center"|OM
|Journalist and broadcaster; the college's first female Honorary Fellow
|align="center"|
|- valign="top"
! scope="row" |
|align="center"|1976
|align="center"|OM
|American Rhodes Scholar; chemist and pioneer of polymer science
|align="center"|
|- valign="top"
! scope="row" |
|align="center"|1882
|align="center"|–
|Lawyer and Celtic scholar
|align="center"|
|- valign="top"
! scope="row" |
|align="center"|1958
|align="center"|OM
|Director-General of the Meteorological Office (1953–65)
|align="center"|
|- valign="top"
! scope="row" |
|align="center"|2008
|align="center"|–
|Welsh opera singer
|align="center"|
|- valign="top"
! scope="row" |
|align="center"|1963
|align="center"|OM
|Permanent Secretary to the Welsh Department of the Department of Education (1945–63), President of University College of Wales, Aberystwyth (1964–75)
|align="center"|
|- valign="top"
! scope="row" |
|align="center"|2001
|align="center"|OM
|MP for Conwy (1951–66) and Hendon South (1970–87), Secretary of State for Wales (1970–74)
|align="center"|
|- valign="top"
! scope="row" |
|align="center"|1908
|align="center"|F
|Naval historian and journalist, who became the first editor of the Times Literary Supplement in 1902
|align="center"|
|- valign="top"
! scope="row" |
|align="center"|1983
|align="center"|F
|First Professor of Paediatrics at the University of Oxford (1972–83)
|align="center"|
|- valign="top"
! scope="row" |
|align="center"|1966
|align="center"|OM
|British Ambassador to Colombia (1964–66)
|align="center"|
|- valign="top"
! scope="row" |
|align="center"|1935
|align="center"|OM
|Bishop of Durham (1939–52) then Bishop of Winchester (1952–61)
|align="center"|
|- valign="top"
! scope="row" |
|align="center"|2008
|align="center"|OM
|Probability theorist who has been Professor of Mathematics at Cambridge, Bath and Swansea Universities
|align="center"|
|- valign="top"
! scope="row" |
|align="center"|1971
|align="center"|OM
|Bishop of Bangor (1957–82) and Archbishop of Wales (1971–82)
|align="center"|
|- valign="top"
! scope="row" |
|align="center"|1963
|align="center"|OM
|Prime Minister (October 1964 – June 1970 and March 1974 – April 1976)
|align="center"|
|- valign="top"
! scope="row" |
|align="center"|1935
|align="center"|OM
|Bishop of Bristol (1933–46) and Bishop of Gloucester (1946–53)
|align="center"|
|- valign="top"
! scope="row" |
|align="center"|1999
|align="center"|OM
|Professor of Theoretical Physics at the University of York (1965–94)
|align="center"|
|- valign="top"
! scope="row" |
|align="center"|1963
|align="center"|OM
|Professor of Mathematics at Aberdeen University (1936–62), then Principal and Vice-Chancellor of Aberdeen University (1962–76)
|align="center"|
|- valign="top"
! scope="row" |
|align="center"|1998
|align="center"|OM
|American journalist and Pulitzer Prize winner (1979)
|align="center"|
|}

See also
List of Honorary Fellows of Keble College, Oxford

ReferencesNotesBibliography'The Jesus College Record – published annually by Jesus College, Oxford. Cited in references as: JCR 
  Cited in references as: Baker, VCH  Cited in references as: Baker, Jesus College  Cited in references as: Hardy
   Cited in references as: ODNB  Cited in references as: Honours  Cited in references as: DWB   Cited in references as: Who's Who   Cited in references as: Who Was Who''

Honorary Fellows
Honorary Fellows
Jesus